The High Hunsley Circuit is a 25½ mile circular walk in the East Riding of Yorkshire, England that visits the villages of Walkington, Skidby, Brantingham, South Cave and Bishop Burton.
The paths themselves are also used by other routes, Yorkshire Wolds Way and Beverley 20.

External links

Further information from the Moorland Challenge Group
A photograph of part of the route leading west from Skidby
Walking Englishman

Footpaths in the East Riding of Yorkshire
Long-distance footpaths in England